Francisco 'Xisco' Hernández Marcos (born 31 July 1989) is a Spanish footballer who last played as a winger for Bengaluru FC in Indian Super League

Club career
Born in Palma, Majorca, Balearic Islands, Hernández grew in the youth ranks of local giants RCD Mallorca. He made his senior debut with the reserves in the 2008–09 season, in Tercera División.

On 4 July 2010, Hernández signed with Elche CF of Segunda División. A month later, however, he terminated his contract, moving to CD Puertollano in early September.

On 27 July 2011, Hernández returned to Mallorca B, now in Segunda División B. On 14 December he made his maiden appearance with the first team, starting in a 0–1 home loss against Sporting de Gijón for the campaign's Copa del Rey.

In August 2012, Hernández joined Lleida Esportiu. He moved clubs again the following year, signing with CD Atlético Baleares also of the third level.

On 18 July 2014, Hernández signed for CF Reus Deportiu, still in Catalonia and in the third tier. On 26 May of the following year he moved to neighbouring club Gimnàstic de Tarragona which had just been promoted to the second division, with the deal being effective in July.

On 13 January 2016, after being rarely used, Hernández returned to Atlético Baleares on loan until June. On 4 April, he terminated his contract with Nàstic.

On 6 July 2018, 29-year-old Hernández moved abroad for the first time in his career and joined Indian Super League franchise Bengaluru FC on a one-year contract. In June 2019, he signed a one-year deal with Odisha FC in the same competition.

Career statistics

Honours
Bengaluru
Indian Super League: 2018–19

References

External links

1989 births
Living people
Spanish footballers
Footballers from Palma de Mallorca
Association football wingers
Segunda División players
Segunda División B players
Tercera División players
RCD Mallorca B players
Elche CF players
CD Puertollano footballers
RCD Mallorca players
Lleida Esportiu footballers
CD Atlético Baleares footballers
CF Reus Deportiu players
Gimnàstic de Tarragona footballers
Indian Super League players
Bengaluru FC players
Odisha FC players
Spanish expatriate footballers
Expatriate footballers in India
Spanish expatriate sportspeople in India